Valter Ojakäär (10 March 1923 Pärnu – 27 October 2016 Tallinn) was an Estonian composer, instrumentalist, music publicist and author.

In 1956 he graduated from Tallinn State Conservatory in composition specialty.

1945–1970 he was a concertmaster for Estonian Television and Radio Variety Orchestra's saxophone group. 1964–1967 and 1975–1980 he taught popular music history and orchestration at Tallinn State Conservatory.

Several his songs have been presented at Estonian Song Celebrations.

Selected works

 1957: song "Fisherman Is a Peculiar Man“ 
 1962: song "Babtizing"
 1967: opera "The King Is Cold"

References

1923 births
2016 deaths
Estonian film score composers
20th-century Estonian composers
20th-century Estonian musicians
Estonian male writers
Estonian non-fiction writers
Estonian Academy of Music and Theatre alumni
Academic staff of the Estonian Academy of Music and Theatre
Recipients of the Order of the White Star, 3rd Class
People from Pärnu
Male non-fiction writers